{{Infobox character
| name      = Wicket W. Warrick
| series    = Star Wars
| image     = Wicket W Warrick.png
| caption   = Wicket the Ewok in Return of the Jedi
| first     = Return of the Jedi (1983)
| last      = The Rise of Skywalker (2019)
| creator   = 
| portrayer = Warwick Davis
| voice     = {{Plainlist|
 Ben Burtt (Episode VI and various media)
{{show|Other:|
 Darryl Henriques (Caravan of Courage and The Battle for Endor)
 Jim Henshaw (Ewoks; season 1)
 Denny Delk (Ewoks; season 2)
}}
}}
| full_name = Wicket Wystri Warrick
| nickname  = Wicket W. Warrick
| species   = Ewok
| spouse    = Kneesaa
| gender    = Male
| family    = 
| children  = Pommet Warrick (son)
| lbl21     = Homeworld
| data21    = Endor
}}Wicket Wystri Warrick, commonly known as Wicket W. Warrick, is a fictional character from the Star Wars franchise, first introduced and portrayed by Warwick Davis in the 1983 film Return of the Jedi. Warrick appeared in two made-for-television movies, an animated series, and promotional media for Star Wars from 1983 to 1986, all of which are a part of the Star Wars Legends continuity. Davis reprised the role in the 2019 theatrical film The Rise of Skywalker, appearing in a brief cameo. Wicket is a diminutive teddy bear-like creature known as an Ewok, living on the forest moon of Endor and eventually participating in the Battle of Endor as an ally of the Rebel Alliance.

Character
Development
In concluding his original Star Wars trilogy, George Lucas had foreseen the decisive battle in the Galactic Civil War taking place between the Wookiees and the Empire; however, he considered Chewbacca too skilled with technology, and wanted a more primitive species than the Wookiees to defeat the Empire. A few different creatures, such as the stilt-legged Yuzzums, were proposed before the diminutive bear-like design of the Ewoks was settled on. Although neither the word Ewok nor any of the Ewok names are actually mentioned in Return of the Jedi, a handful of Ewoks were named by the production, mentioned in the novelization, and first appeared in the Kenner action figure line based on the movie.

The main focal point of this new Ewok species was to be Wicket Wystri Warrick, a small young male scout and warrior. Generally considered to be the most well known of the Ewoks, Wicket would be given the lead role in almost all subsequent Ewok related media released after Return of the Jedi.

Casting
Wicket was portrayed by Warwick Davis in 1983's Return of the Jedi. The then 11-year-old actor came to be involved in the film after his grandmother heard a radio ad calling for short actors. Davis began work on the film in January 1982. Originally cast as a generic Ewok, Davis caught the eye of George Lucas with aspects of his performance, such as his ability to stick his tongue through his Ewok mask and the inquisitive tilting of his head (which was inspired by Davis' dog). Kenny Baker (who also portrayed R2-D2) was originally set to take the role of Wicket; however, Baker fell ill with food poisoning, and Davis was called in as a replacement.Empire of Dreams: The Story of the Star Wars Trilogy (2004). DVD. 20th Century Fox Television. Event occurs at 2:17:00.

Appearances
Film
The character made his first appearance in the 1983 film Return of the Jedi. Wicket was the first Ewok to appear on screen, encountering Princess Leia Organa after she survived her speeder bike chase, bringing her to his tree-top Ewok village, and making contact with the Rebel Alliance during the Battle of Endor. Wicket was also featured in the later village scenes, as well as helping the Alliance during the Battle of Endor itself, attacking Imperial stormtroopers with his slingshot.

At the end of The Rise of Skywalker, Wicket makes a brief appearance alongside Pommet Warrick, his son, celebrating the defeat of Darth Sidious and the Sith Eternal. Warwick Davis reprised his character role, alongside his real life son Harrison Davis, who played Pommet.

Forces of Destiny
Wicket appears in the micro-series Star Wars Forces of Destiny.

Legends

In April 2014 (with the sequel film The Force Awakens in production), Lucasfilm separated the Star Wars Expanded Universe (rebranded as Star Wars Legends) from official Star Wars canon.

Television films
Wicket was featured in the 1984 TV film The Ewok Adventure (set before Return of the Jedi), theatrically released as Caravan of Courage: An Ewok Adventure. In the film, he accompanies stranded brother and sister Mace and Cindel Towani as he and the Ewoks help find and rescue the children's missing parents from the giant Gorax. Wicket is revealed to be the son of Deej and Shodu, and has two older brothers, Weechee and Widdle.

Wicket would return the following year in a sequel, Ewoks: The Battle for Endor. In this film, Wicket helps Cindel and new allies Noa (Wilfred Brimley) and Teek defeat King Terak and his Sanyassan Marauders. This film strengthened the bonds between Wicket and Cindel, with Wicket rescuing his family and learning to speak some Galactic Basic (which he seems to have forgotten by the time of Return of the Jedi).

 Ewoks 
Wicket was the main character in the animated series Ewoks, which ran for two seasons in 1985 and 1986, consisting of 35 episodes. This children's cartoon series, set in the fictional Bright Tree Village, mostly featured the antics of Wicket and his family (in line with the TV movies). Wicket's friends Kneesaa and Latara were introduced, and further backstories for existing Ewok characters Teebo, Paploo, Chief Chirpa, and Logray were established. The series's would also often showcase Wicket and the Ewoks' battles with the Duloks, Morag the witch, and other creatures on the moon of Endor.

Related works and merchandising
In the 1980s, Wicket was heavily featured in several promotional items, toys, children's books, read-along records and cassettes and comic books.

Reception
Wicket and the Ewoks are a controversial addition to Return of the Jedi'' and the Star Wars Universe in general, and are seen by some to be the weakest link of the original trilogy. According to Tami Katzoff of MTV News, "a prevailing theory among Ewok-haters is that the creatures were originally conceived as a sure way to appeal to small children and sell plush toys to their parents." The Ewoks have some defenders, and have proven to be very popular with children from their introduction in the 1980s to the present day.

References

External links 
 
 
 Wicket W. Warrick on IMDb

Characters created by George Lucas
Film characters introduced in 1983
Fictional polearm and spearfighters
Fictional princes
Fictional war veterans
Extraterrestrial superheroes
Star Wars Skywalker Saga characters
Return of the Jedi